Grinnell is a city in Gove County, Kansas, United States.  As of the 2020 census, the population of the city was 260.

History
Grinnell was named for businessman Moses Hicks Grinnell.

The first newspaper in Grinnell was the Golden Belt, in 1885.

Geography
Grinnell is located at  (39.123999, -100.629852).

Demographics

2010 census
As of the census of 2010, there were 259 people, 135 households, and 81 families residing in the city. The racial makeup of the city was 100.0% White. Hispanic or Latino of any race were 0.4% of the population.

There were 135 households, of which 14.1% had children under the age of 18 living with them, 54.8% were married couples living together, 3.7% had a female householder with no husband present, 1.5% had a male householder with no wife present, and 40.0% were non-families. 38.5% of all households were made up of individuals, and 18.6% had someone living alone who was 65 years of age or older. The average household size was 1.92 and the average family size was 2.48.

The median age in the city was 55.9 years. 13.5% of residents were under the age of 18; 5% were between the ages of 18 and 24; 16.6% were from 25 to 44; 32.8% were from 45 to 64; and 32% were 65 years of age or older. The gender makeup of the city was 52.1% male and 47.9% female.

2000 census
As of the census of 2000, there were 329 people, 149 households, and 87 families residing in the city. The racial makeup of the city was 99.70% White and 0.30% African American. Hispanic or Latino of any race were 0.61% of the population.

There were 149 households, out of which 19.5% had children under the age of 18 living with them, 51.7% were married couples living together, 4.0% had a female householder with no husband present, and 41.6% were non-families. 39.6% of all households were made up of individuals, and 28.2% had someone living alone who was 65 years of age or older. The average household size was 2.21 and the average family size was 2.98.

In the city, the population was spread out, with 22.5% under the age of 18, 7.6% from 18 to 24, 19.5% from 25 to 44, 21.6% from 45 to 64, and 28.9% who were 65 years of age or older. The median age was 45 years. For every 100 females, there were 104.3 males. For every 100 females age 18 and over, there were 105.6 males.

The median income for a household in the city was $35,833, and the median income for a family was $41,750. Males had a median income of $27,167 versus $21,500 for females. The per capita income for the city was $20,056. About 9.2% of families and 8.2% of the population were below the poverty line, including 8.5% of those under age 18 and 8.6% of those age 65 or over.

Education
USD 291 Grinnell has a cooperative agreement with USD 292 Wheatland to educate high school students at Wheatland High School. The Wheatland High School mascot is a Thunderhawk.

Grinnell High School was closed with the cooperative agreement.

The Grinnell Warriors won the following Kansas State High School championships:
 1974 Boys Basketball - Class 1A 
 1976 Girls Volleyball - Class 1A 
 1979 Girls Volleyball - Class 1A 
 1981 Girls Volleyball - Class 1A 
 1982 Girls Volleyball - Class 1A 
 1985 Girls Basketball - Class 1A 
 1987 Girls Volleyball - Class 1A 
 1988 Girls Volleyball - Class 1A

Notable people
 Ralph Ostmeyer, Kansas State Senator

References

Further reading

External links

 Grinnell - Directory of Public Officials
 USD 291, local school district
 Grinnell City Map, KDOT

Cities in Kansas
Cities in Gove County, Kansas